The Supreme Deity of the Yukaghir is called Pon, meaning "Something."  Pon controlled all visible phenomena of nature such as the transition from day to night or the rain.

References

Siberian deities
Yukaghir people